Fantastik is an American trademarked brand of cleaning products produced by S. C. Johnson & Son. The company acquired Fantastik as part of a package of products acquired in 1998. These products include:  Antibacterial Heavy Duty, Bleach, Antibacterial Lemon Power, Orange Action, Oxy Power, Orange Action Wipes, and Multi-Surface Wipes.

The company initiated its Greenlist initiative in 2001.

History
The 1967-introduced Fantastik was described by The New York Times as "the first spray cleaner." Invented by Roy Bambrough while working for Dow in Ontario, Canada.
 
In 1998, S. C. Johnson expanded its roster of consumer brands by purchasing Dow Chemical's DowBrands division, which included
Ziploc, Saran, Fantastik, and Scrubbing Bubbles.   Related Dow products included Glass Plus and Spray 'N Wash. Prior to its Dow name the manufacturer was known as Texize Chemicals and one of its products was named Janitor-in-a-Drum.The New York Times, in reporting about another cleaning product, also wrote about "the 19th-century pantry, when vinegar and baking soda were the Fantastik of their day." In 2011, the company introduced it's "snip 'n' pour" pouch "so customers can refill old bottles with a concentrated Windex formula diluted with water from the tap" and a single-use product.

List of Fantastik products

Competing products
Among those products competing with Fantastik at the time it was launched were:
 Procter & Gamble's Dawn Oxy dish soap
 Cloroxs Oxi-Magic
 Orange Glo International'''s OxiClean
 Tide Oxy Reckitt & Colman's Lysol Kitchen Spray

The Oxy and Oxi names are derived from the use of hydrogen peroxide.

Environmental considerations
In 2001, Fantastiks manufacturer, S.C. Johnson, began what it called its Greenlist initiative, "in which it rates all the raw materials used in its products for environmental safety." Although a decade later, the New York Times headlined "As Consumers Cut Spending, 'Green' Products Lose Allure," by 2020, the category had made a comeback. A survey cited by Newsweek regarding being eco-minded said that "75 percent of adults in the U.S. now feel a personal obligation."

See also
 Spiffits

References

External links
 Fantastik (website)
 S.C. Johnson Company (website)

Cleaning product brands
Products introduced in 1967
S. C. Johnson & Son brands